The Police of Germany may refer to one of a number of German law enforcement agencies.

For an over view look at: 

Law enforcement in Germany

Federal 
 The Federal Police (Bundespolizei or BPOL), subordinate to the Federal Ministry of the Interior
 The Federal Criminal Police Office (Bundeskriminalamt)
 The German Parliament Police (Bundestagspolizei)
 The German Federal Coast Guard (Küstenwache des Bundes)
 The German Customs Investigation Bureau (Zollkriminalamt, ZKA)
 The Military Police Feldjäger of the German armed forces Bundeswehr

State police 
 The state police forces (Landespolizeien), subordinated to the Ministry of the Interior of the particular German state:
Baden-Württemberg State Police
Bavarian State Police 	
Berlin State Police 	
Brandenburg State Police 	
Bremen State Police 
Hamburg State Police 	
Hesse State Police 	
Lower Saxony State Police 	
Mecklenburg-Vorpommern State Police 	
North Rhine-Westphalia State Police 	
Rhineland-Palatinate State Police 	
Saarland State Police
Saxony State Police 	
Saxony-Anhalt State Police 	
Schleswig-Holstein State Police 
Thuringia State Police

Federal law enforcement agencies of Germany